The 1875 Dallas mayoral election was a mayoral and municipal election in Dallas, Texas. The election was held on April 6, 1875. In the election, W. L. Cabell defeated challenger J. C. Bogel and eventual mayor John Kerfoot.

References

Mayoral elections in Dallas
Non-partisan elections